Halleluya Panduleni Nekundi (born 14 September 1998) is a Namibian footballer who plays as a forward for African Stars F.C. and the Namibia national football team.

Career

International
Nekundi made his senior international debut on 4 January 2014 in a 1-0 friendly defeat to Ghana. In his next appearance, he scored his first senior international goal, equalizing late in a 1-1 friendly draw with Tanzania.

International goals
Scores and results list Namibia's goal tally first.

Career statistics

International

References

External links

1998 births
Living people
Namibian men's footballers
Namibia international footballers
Association football forwards
People from ǁKaras Region
Namibia Premier League players
United Africa Tigers players
African Stars F.C. players
Namibia A' international footballers
2018 African Nations Championship players
2020 African Nations Championship players